Lal Mohammad Iqbal were a Pakistani composer duo, consisting of Lal Mohammad (1933 – 29 September 2009) and Buland Iqbal (1930 – 25 July 2013). They were among the leading musicians of Pakistan film industry belonging to the golden era of film songs.

Buland Iqbal composed music at Radio Pakistan with his colleague Lal Mohammad and the duo was known as Lal Mohammad Iqbal. They had joined Radio Pakistan, Karachi within a span of six months in 1950. At first, they together composed 'geets' and 'ghazals' for Radio Pakistan. The duo is primarily remembered for their compositions in the voice of playback singer Ahmed Rushdi.

Early life and career
Buland Iqbal was the son of Ustad Bundu Khan (1880 – 1955), the famous sarangi player of the subcontinent and he was the younger brother of Umrao Bundu Khan, a sarangi player and classical singer. Belonging to a family of classical musicians of Delhi gharana, Buland Iqbal had command over numerous ragas, which he also sang.
 
Iqbal used to compose music on Radio and then with his mate Lal Mohammad. He started his film career in 1961 with the film Bara Bajey (1962).

They were first given the chance for films by playback singer Ahmed Rushdi as Rushdi introduced them to different film producers.

The duo composed music for at least 40 films and utilized the voices of many playback singers, including three vocalists from India, namely Talat Mahmood, C. H. Atma and Mubarak Begum. Their last film as a music director was Sab Ke Baap which was released in 1994. Lal Mohammad had died earlier on 29 September 2009 whereas over the last two decades, Buland Iqbal devoted his time to teaching classical and ghazal singing. His devotion for music was so intense that till the age of 80, he would come to teach music four to five times in a week driving his motorbike from his residence in Liaquatabad, Karachi to many other parts of the city.

Death
Lal Mohammad and Buland Iqbal were totally forgotten by the Pakistani film industry and spent their last years in anonymity. Buland Iqbal died on 25 July 2013 in Karachi at age 83, whereas Lal Mohammad had died earlier on 29 September 2009.

Popular compositions of Lal Mohammad Iqbal

References

External links
 Filmography of Lal Mohammad Iqbal on IMDb website

1930 births
2013 deaths
Radio personalities from Karachi
Pakistani film score composers
Pakistani musicians
Musicians from Karachi
Muhajir people